Marco Bolognesi is an artist working in a variety of media such as drawing and painting, cinema, photo- and videography.

Bolognesi was born in 1974 in Bologna, Italy into a family of artists. His youth was spent in an artistic environment, and he went on to attend the School of Drama, Arts and Music at the University of Bologna.

At the age of 20, Bolognesi illustrated a selection of works by the poet Roberto Roversi, and in the following year he collaborated with the graphic artist Guido Crepax on one of his comic strips. In 1994 he shot his first short film, ‘Giustizia e Verità’ (Justice and Truth) about the victims of terrorism, which was then shown at the Venice Biennale. In this experimental documentary, images and music were deeply interwoven, as they were in his second short film on the same theme, ‘il Partito del Silenzio’ (The Silent Party), made in 1996. Subsequently both films were presented in Rome by the Academy Award-winning composer Ennio Morricone. The film was also shown internationally at many Italian cultural institutes.

Bolognesi then focused on cinema, working as a director’s assistant for Daniele Luchetti, among other directors. His interest then shifted to the medium of photography. Bolognesi's first project was with Nobel Prize winner Dario Fo.

In 2002, Bolognesi moved to London where he won the artist in residence award at the Italian cultural institute, and undertook his first major photographic project. The outcome was Woodland, a series of stills in collaboration with fashion designers such as Vivienne Westwood, Alexander McQueen, Kei Kagami and Dolce & Gabbana. These studio images combined tribal art, fetish, punk culture and glamorous fashion, using collage techniques to synthesize natural and artificial elements into an imagined breed of beautiful, yet powerful, hybrid women.

Recent works
In 2006, Bolognesi presented his photographic work Woodland at the Trafalgar hotel in London, which culminated in the photographic series Synteborg in 2007. In the spring of 2008, Bolognesi made the short film Black Hole on the theme of hybrids and cyborgs. In summer 2008, one of his stills was internationally shown as part of the 'collezione farnesina experimenta', a touring exhibition of Italy’s most influential artists. 2008 saw the international release of Dark Star, Bolognesi’s second photographic publication, which was based on the 1974 film by Peter Greenaway which includes a selection of his photographic works accompanied by a sci-fi short and additional text.

In 2009, Einaudi will present a collaborative and experimental art/comics/fiction book by Bolognesi and Carlo Lucarelli. Also in 2009, Bolognesi exhibited some installation work at the Fondazione Solares in Parma, Italy.

Publications by Marco Bolognesi
 La Cartamatta Published by Pendragon, Bologna, 1997.
 Woodland Published by Bomar Edition London, 2006.
 Dark Star Published by Bomar Edition and Silvana Editoriale, 2008.
 Protocollo Published by Einaudi Publishers, 2009.

Filmography
 Giustizia e Verita (Justice and truth), 1994.
 Il Partito del silenzio (the silence party), 1996.
 Black hole, 2008.

External links
Marco Bolognesi Official Website
Bomar Edition
ARTKEY
arte.go/ Arte
artnet.fr

2009

Z Generation/The Realm of Ambiguity
Olyvia Oriental Gallery - London
Artnet
Artnet galleries
Olyvia Oriental
Artnet Exhibitions
Thisislondon.co.uk
Artslant
Art Review

Genesis
Fondazione Solares - Parma
nonsolocinema
teknemedia
parma.repubblica
parmaok
exibart
teknemedia archive
Cinema-Edison
dark star
rassegna
www.youtube.com/watch?v=hXyUO8kxcj4
www.youtube.com/watch?v=SuZvUFzyEM0
www.youtube.com/watch?v=c7aOQmutPlo
www.youtube.com/watch?v=4T9YNNoj_SY
www.youtube.com/watch?v=s0RoMMySc-M
google book
exibart

2008

La memoria dentro il futuro 
Casa Masaccio Centro per l’Arte Contemporanea – San Giovanni Valdarno (AR) 
curated by Gianluca Marziani
webartex
055news
teknemedia
ilreporter
viaroma100.net
intoscana
casamasaccio
galleriacarini

2007

Marco Bolognesi
La Nuova Pesa Centro per l'arte Contemporanea – Rome 
curated by Giacomo Zaza
nikonclubitalia
teknemedia
immaginaria

Back in black
Galleria Contemporanea – Pescara 
curated by Gianluca Marziani
underupphotogallery

2006

Woodland
Cynthia Corbett Gallery – London
the-cynthia-corbett-gallery-london-woodland-the-trafalgar-london
thecynthiacorbettgallery

Woodland 
Galleria Paolo Nanni – Bologna
curated by Martina Corgnati
exibart
teknemedia

2003

Woodland
I.C.I. – London
iicbelgrado

Selected Group Exhibitions

2008

Work in Progress, Galleria Giarina- Verona
teknemedia

Experimenta, Farnesina Collection (Ministry of Foreign Affairs) – Rome, Italy
fondazioneitaliani
teknemedia

Not so Private, Mambo, Museum of Contemporary Art – Bologna
exibart
teknemedia

2007

Faces, Monochromatic Art Gallery- Rome
teknemedia
monocromo

Roseto dialettico. Fenomenlogia di un fiore
exibart
teknemedia

2006

Anima Digitale, Galleria Sergio Tossi- Fortezza da basso – Florence
intoscana

2005

Serrone, Biennale giovani di Monza – Milan
Femme05- Spazio Desia, Bologna
teknemedia

Confinio3 – Massenzio Arte-Foto Grafia International photographic festival- Rome
teknemedia

Photogallery, Palazzo Medidi Riccardi, Florence

2004

Mostra Fotografica- Collezione Hotel Corona D’oro 1890 – Bologna
teknemedia

Publications
books.google.com/books?id=-ef4PQAACAAJ&dq=marco+bolognesi&lr=&ei=Qp1MSpCAMpvayQT0n9DXDw
books?id=-ef4PQAACAAJ&dq=marco+bolognesi&lr=&ei=Mp9MSuHXH4zqzATRjJ3eDw
books.google.com/books?id=BEMoAAAACAAJ&dq=marco+bolognesi&lr=&ei=Up9MSrTqIKHwygTty_jKDw
books.google.com/books?id=ykmKPQAACAAJ&dq=marco+bolognesi&lr=&ei=f59MSrOtD6SUywSduIDWDw
books.google.com/books?id=EWiUAAAACAAJ&dq=marco+bolognesi+cartamatta&lr=&ei=tp9MSpuIGJbozATn18zuDw
books.google.com/books?id=eFZWAAAAMAAJ&q=marco+bolognesi+journal+photography&dq=marco+bolognesi+journal+photography&lr=&ei=B6BMSs7MOYy2yQSnnbTNDw

Filmography

Black hole, 2008.
indieshortfilms
riff

General
www.youtube.com/watch?v=ZFi6O9IxUug
gallery.panorama.it
www.youtube.com/watch?v=lybw4QMTtek
www.youtube.com/watch?v=9WNUkz9KRQ4
www.youtube.com/watch?v=9WNUkz9KRQ4
google books

photofinish
artslant
artfacts
exibart
ilsole24ore.com
myspace
cinema of Italy

References
[www.newexhibitions.com/uploads/upload.000/.../press_release.pdf/ New exhibitions]
[www.viewlondon.co.uk/.../marco-bolognesi-z-generation-realm-of- ambiguity-article-108693-27448.html/ View London]
[www.thelondonpaper.com/going-out/.../marco-bolognesi.../2009/ The London paper]
new exhibitions
Cgi
Bomar Edition

Italian photographers
Italian film directors
Living people
Year of birth missing (living people)
Italian contemporary artists